The following is a list of the 83 known endemic bird species in Colombia (about 4% of Colombian species) with notes about their general distribution. Twenty-three (28%) of the species are found only in the Sierra Nevada de Santa Marta, an isolated mountain range in northern Colombia with a very high degree of endemism.

Endemic bird list

Image gallery

References

See also 
 List of birds of Colombia

 

Birds